David Siegel  is an American producer, songwriter and musician based in Miami, FL.  He is best known for co-writing Escape recorded by Enrique Iglesias in 2002, as well as co-writing a three-times certified platinum song by the RIAA. Whatever You Like recorded by T.I. in 2008, which remained #1 in the Billboard Hot 100 for seven non-consecutive weeks.

Siegel placed #3 in the Top Ten Songwriters Chart listed in Billboard Magazine's First Publishers Quarterly Edition issued in May 2009.

He has songs written with writers/artists/producers such as Beyonce, Kara DioGuardia, Christina Aguilera, Cathy Dennis, Shelly Peiken, Linda Perry, Shepp Soloman, Rico Love, Jim Jonsin, Mutt Lang, Rico Beats, Ron Fair, Steve Morales, Bilewa Mohammed, and Mike Caren.

He is the only writer/producer whose repertoire spans from pop divas such as Celine Dion, Christina Aguilera, and Jessica Simpson, rap artists like Pusha T, T.I., and Soulja Boy, several prominent Latin American crossover artists, to notable jazz artists like Kurt Elling and Arturo Sandoval.

Awards
2010 – BMI Pop Award for Whatever You Like recorded by T.I.
2009 – BMI Urban Award for Whatever You Like recorded by T.I.
2005 – BMI Latin Award for Cerca de Ti/Closer To You recorded by Thalía.
2003 – BMI Latin Award, and BMI Pop Award for Escape recorded by Enrique Iglesias.

Discography and song credits
Krystal Poppin (2021) - Composer/Producer/Keyboards
"Ain't No Stoppin'"
CNCO - CNCO (2018) - Composer/Keyboards
”Estoy Enamorado De Ti”
Lauren Mayhew - Reload the Summer (2016) - Composer
"Wake Up"
Jean Caze - Amédé (2015) - Keyboards
Arturo Sandoval - Live at Yoshi's (2015) - Keyboards
Elliott Yamin - As Time Goes By (2015) - Composer, Keyboards
"Magnetic"
"In My Dreams"
Miss A - Colors (2015) - Composer, Keyboards
"Melting"
Kurt Elling - Passion World (2015) - Pianist
"Bonita Cuba"
Mod Sun - Look Up (2014) - Composer, Keyboards
"Look Up"
Pusha T (2012) – Composer, Keyboards
"Exodus 23:1"
OV7 – A Tu Lado (2013) – Composer
"A Tu Lado"
Paty Cantú – Corazón Bipolar (2012) – Composer
"Silencios Que Salvan"
"El Sexo Y El Amor"
Mod Sun/The Ready Set (2011) – Composer, Producer, Keyboards
"All Night, Every Night"
Mod Sun – In MOD We Trust (2011) – Composer, Producer, Keyboards
"Paradisity"
"No Girlfriend (Milyun)"
"Need That"
"Time to Celebrate"
"Undressing America"
Wanessa – DNA (2011) – Composer
"Rescue Mission"
"Tonight Forever"
Flo Rida – Only One Flo (Part 1) (2010) – Composer, Keyboards
"Momma"
The Ready Set – I'm Alive, I'm Dreaming (2010) – Producer, Keyboards
"Limits"
"Upsets and Downfalls"
Amerie – In Love & War (2009) – Composer, Keyboards
"Swag Back"Now That's What I Call Music! 31 (2009)
Soulja Boy Tell 'Em – "Kiss Me thru the Phone"
Deana Martin - Memories Are Made of These (2009)
Soulja Boy Tell 'Em – iSouljaBoyTellem (2008)
"Kiss Me thru the Phone"Now That's What I Call Music! 29 (2008)
T.I. – "Whatever You Like"
T.I. – Paper Trail (2008) – Composer, Keyboards
"Whatever You Like"
Arturo Sandoval - Live in Ann Harbour DVD (2007) - Pianist, Keyboards
Raging Geisha - Insider (2005-2006) - Original pop/rock project, independent release
Will Young - "Your Game" (2004) - Composer, Keyboards
"Down"
Thalía – Thalía (2004) – Composer, Keyboards
"Misbehavin
"Another Girl"
"Cerca de Ti/Closer to You"
"Save the Day"
Clay Aiken – Measure of a Man (2003) – Composer, Keyboards
"The Way"
"Measure of a Man"
Christina Aguilera – Stripped (2002) – Composer, Keyboards
"Get Mine, Get Yours"Now That's What I Call Music! 10 (2002)
Enrique Iglesias – "Escape"
Luis Fonsi – Fight the Feeling (2002) – Composer, Keyboards
"Tell Her Tonight"
Marc Anthony – Mended (2002) – Composer, Keyboards
"I Swear"
Celine Dion – A New Day Has Come (2002) – Composer, Keyboards
"Right in Front of You"
Soluna – For All Time (2002) – Composer, Keyboards
"Bring It to Me"
"Nothing Looks Good on Me but You"
"For All Time"
"I'll Be Waiting for You"
"All Out of Love"
"He Should Be You"Now That's What I Call Music! 8 (2001)
Jessica Simpson – "A Little Bit"
Enrique Iglesias – Escape (2001) – Composer, Keyboards
"Escape"
"Don't Turn Off the Lights"
"I Will Survive"
"Love 4 Fun"
"Maybe"
Pink - Missundaztood (2001) - Keyboards
"Gone to California"
Joy Enriquez – Joy Enriquez (2001) – Composer, Keyboards
"What Do You Want?"
"Uh Oh"
Jessica Simpson – Irresistible (2001)
"A Little Bit"
Ricky Martin – Sound Loaded (2000) – Composer, Keyboards
"One Night Man"
Jon Secada – Better Part of Me (2000) – Composer, Keyboards
"You Should Be Mine"
"Papi"
"Lost Inside of You"
Silk – Tonight'' (1999) – Composer, Keyboards
"Baby Check Your Friend"

Touring and television appearances
piano track for Olivia Rodrigo's "Driver's Licence" Brit Awards performance
50 Cent (Las Vegas)
Cory Henry with Nu Deco Ensemble
Tank and the Bangas with Nu Deco Ensemble
Richard Bona with Nu Deco Ensemble
Jose James with Nu Deco Ensemble
PJ Morton with Nu Deco Ensemble
Latin Grammys 2019 with Bad Bunny
Wyclef Jean with Nu Deco Ensemble
Flo Rida
Pitbull
The Stanley Clarke Band
KC and the Sunshine Band
Arturo Sandoval
Chayanne
SkeeTV with: Post Malone, Kehlani, 
  Machine Gun Kelly, OT Genaesis Casey
  Veggies, Kyle
The Voice
Ellen
The View
Good Morning America
The Source Awards

References

External links
 RagingGeisha.com/Siegel

1973 births
Living people
Musicians from Miami
Songwriters from Florida